Peter Brian Driver (26 June 1932 – 12 November 1971) was a British track and field athlete who competed in long-distance running events. He was the gold medallist in the six-mile run at the 1954 British Empire and Commonwealth Games. His winning time of  minutes was a games record and the first time anyone had run the distance in under half an hour at the tournament. He also ran the 3-mile race at that games, placing fifth.

Driver made one other major appearance internationally, taking sixth place in the 10,000 metres at the 1954 European Athletics Championships. He won one British national title in his career, taking the six-mile title in 1954. He also won the national junior title in cross country in 1953. A member of South London Harriers, he later became honorary club secretary of Fleet & Crookham AC. A year after his death the club founded the Peter Driver Memorial Road Races, including a six-mile race in recognition of his Commonwealth victory, which is now known as the Fleet 10K run.

International competitions

References

External links
All Athletics profile

1932 births
1971 deaths
English male long-distance runners
Commonwealth Games gold medallists for England
Commonwealth Games medallists in athletics
Athletes (track and field) at the 1954 British Empire and Commonwealth Games
Medallists at the 1954 British Empire and Commonwealth Games